CFAJ (1220 kHz) is a commercial AM radio station in St. Catharines, Ontario, Canada.  It is owned by Radio Dhun and it broadcasts a Classic Hits radio format.  The station was off the air from 2010 to 2020.

CFAJ broadcasts at 10,000 watts using a directional antenna with a nine-tower array to prevent co-channel interference with WHKW Cleveland, as well as 1230 WECK in Cheektowaga, forty miles to the east.  CFAJ can be heard as far north as parts of cottage country and west beyond Guelph.  The transmitter is off Turner Road in Thorold, near the Welland Canal.

History

Early years
In , the station signed on the air as CHSC.  It was owned by Radio Station CHSC Ltd., which also launched CHSC-FM at the same time. The station was acquired by Coultis Broadcasting in 1990.  CHSC had a full service adult contemporary radio format, with some oldies along with a bit of country music, typically attracting audiences ages 30 and up, both male and female.   CHSC played a mix of 50 per cent gold and 50 per cent current/recurrent of which 45 per cent on average consisted of Canadian content during the broadcast week of Sunday to Saturday.

Listeners could also find talk shows in both English and Italian. The station's regular English programming was branded as 1220 CHSC, and its Italian programming was branded as Radio Uno.

In 1997, the station entered into a local marketing agreement (LMA) with CJRN and CKEY in Niagara Falls. The station subsequently applied to move to FM in 2001, but withdrew the application.

Coultis went into receivership in 2002, and the station was acquired by Pellpropco Inc.

2008 problems
In the summer 2008, the Queenston Street building, which housed CHSC's studio and offices since its founding, were seized by bailiffs and all of the contents were auctioned off.  This was allegedly due either to large sums of unpaid rent and taxes; to physical deterioration, according to documents filed by the station owner with the CRTC; or both.

The CRTC announced a January 2009 hearing to inquire into format violations, missing financial statements, logger tapes, the loss of the studio, and the station's allegedly being operated from Woodbridge, a suburb of Toronto, rather than St. Catharines. CHSC's web site is a mere welcome message and a link to the online streaming. On June 30, 2009, the CRTC issued a number of mandatory orders to Pellpropco regarding the management of the station.

2010 shutdown
On July 30, 2010, the CRTC issued a decision that it would not renew the station's license, requiring the station to cease broadcasting at the end of the broadcast day of August 31. The CRTC cited numerous failures to comply with regulations and with commission orders, and the doubtfulness of the station management's promises to comply in the future.  

According to CRTC media relations, Pellpropco filed a motion on August 25 with the Federal Court of Canada, and a stay was issued on August 31. This allowed CHSC to remain on the air, legally, pending a decision by that court. CHSC was noted on-air the afternoon of September 1 with regular programming (Radio Uno at that time).  The court declined to allow an appeal on September 30, effectively putting an end to the station for good; by October 2, CHSC was off the air.

In January 2015, the former CHSC studios at 36 Queenston Street in St. Catharines waere demolished.  The land was used for a four-storey apartment building.

2012: Rejected application for 1220
On July 10, 2012, 8045313 Canada Inc. (a numbered company unrelated to Pellpropco Inc.) applied for a new radio station which would broadcast a music format that would consist of a mix of past, present and emerging artists. If it had been approved, the new station would have operated at 1220 kHz (AM), the former frequency used by CHSC until its shutdown in late 2010. 

The application was denied by the CRTC on January 30, 2013.  The 1220 frequency remained silent during this time.

2015: New application for 1220
On October 21, 2015, Sivanesarajah Kandiah submitted an application for 1220 kHz, which would operate with 10,000 watts full-time and will utilize the transmitting equipment previously used by CHSC. The station was proposed to have a classic hits format under the branding "Grapevine Radio".  This application was approved on April 20, 2016.  

After several years of construction and planning, 1220 returned to the air in 2020 with the new call sign CFAJ.

Previous Programming
In later years, CHSC's program schedule consisted of English and Italian-language spoken word and music programming.

English-language programming ran during the week, interspersed with Italian-language music in the afternoons.  1220 CHSC was one of the last AM stations remaining in Canada that played current charted music. The music was 50% gold and 50% current-recurrent with above the average Canadian content required.   The CRTC only required CHSC to play 35 per cent Canadian content over the course of the broadcast week (Sunday to Saturday) but CHSC averaged about 45% during the broadcast week.

Spoken word programming consisted largely of news updates at the top of each hour from 6 a.m. till 6 p.m. on weekdays, and the It's Your Call Sports Show on Monday nights. Italian-language programming branded as Radio Uno began at 9am Saturdays and ran right through till 6am Monday morning when programming reverted to English.

CHSC also experimented with other third-language programming. During about three months of 2008 South-Asian Dhoom (Hindu music and chat) aired weekdays in the last couple of hours before noon and at the supper hour for about three hours. Caribbean Connection, a mix of soca music and English-language chat aired on Saturdays and Sundays during the supper hour for three hours on Saturday and two hours on Sunday. Both South-Asian Dhoom and Caribbean Connection were eventually cancelled.

References

External links
 
 
 Federal Court of Appeal docket - Aug-Sep 2010

FAJ
FAJ
Radio stations established in 1967
Radio stations disestablished in 2010
Internet radio stations in Canada
1967 establishments in Ontario
2010 disestablishments in Ontario
2020 establishments in Ontario
Radio stations established in 2020